Sady Pridonya is a rural locality (a settlement) in Panshinskoye Rural Settlement, Gorodishchensky District, Volgograd Oblast, Russia. The population was 691 as of 2010. There are 18 streets.

Geography 
Sady Pridonya is located on the Panshinka River, 57 km northwest of Gorodishche (the district's administrative centre) by road. Panshino is the nearest rural locality.

References 

Rural localities in Gorodishchensky District, Volgograd Oblast